Fursaxa is a United States-based psychedelic folk or freak folk project led by Tara Burke of Pennsylvania. Her home-recordings feature acoustic guitar, simple Casio electronic keyboards, accordion, dulcimer and her heavily overdubbed vocals on a 4-track recorder.

She has been making music since childhood. Her music has been compared to Nico's solo work and is often categorized among New Weird America artists. The writings of Medieval mystic Hildegard von Bingen, Vladimir Nabokov, and Mircea Eliade have influenced the lyrics and mood of her work. Her musical influences include:  World music, Krautrock, film soundtracks, Minimalism, Medieval and Renaissance music. She has recorded with numerous bands as a guest or side-project, including Acid Mothers Temple, fellow Philadelphians Bardo Pond, Iditarod, Scorces, The Valerie Project, and Six Organs of Admittance. Fursaxa is currently signed to the London-based ATP Recordings label. Live performances in 2010 saw Fursaxa expand to a trio, with Burke backed by harpist Mary Lattimore and cellist Helena Espvall, culminating in an appearance at the ATP New York 2010 music festival in Monticello, New York. Burke and Espvall also record and perform together as a duo under the name Anahita.

Discography 

Studio Albums

Immured LP, Sloowax (2016)Mycorrhizae Realm – CD & LP ATP Recordings (2010)Alone in the Dark Wood – CD, ATP Recordings & LP, Eclipse Records (2007)Amulet – CD, Last Visible Dog (2005)Lepidoptera – CD, ATP Recordings (2005)Madrigals in Duos – LP, Time-Lag Records (2004)Fursaxa – LP, Ecstatic Peace! (2002)Mandrake – CD, Acid Mothers Temple (2000) & LP, Eclipse Records (2004)

 Singles, EPs, and Limited Releases Maidenstone – 7-inch EP, Mt. St. Mtn. (2007)Harbinger of Spring – 3"CD, Jewelled Antler (2004)Fursaxa/Juniper Meadows – split CDR, Foxglove (2004)

Self Released (Sylph) RecordingsKobold Moon – CD (2008)Myriad of Satyrids – CDR (2006)Amulet – CDR (2004)The Cult From Moon Mountain – CDR (2003)Trobairitz Are Here From Venus – CDR (2002)

With Helena Espvall, as AnahitaArcana En Cantos – CD-R, Deserted Village (2006); LP, alt.vinyl (2010)Matricaria – CD, Important Records (2008)

With Sharron Kraus, as Tau EmeraldTravellers Two'' – CD, Important Records (2008)

External links
fursaxa blog
ATP Recordings page
The Philadelphia Ambient Consortium
Free Music Archive
Interview with Tara Burke

New Weird America
Psychedelic folk musicians
1969 births
Living people
Ecstatic Peace! artists
ATP Recordings artists